Zheng Qingdian (born December 1952) was a Chinese diplomat. He was born in Changsha, Hunan. He was Ambassador of the People's Republic of China to Bangladesh (2007–2009), Afghanistan (2009–2011) and Jamaica (2011–2013).

References

1952 births
Living people
Ambassadors of China to Bangladesh
Ambassadors of China to Afghanistan
Ambassadors of China to Jamaica
People from Changsha
Date of birth missing (living people)
WHO laureates